Mt. Pleasant is a neighborhood in Newark in Essex County, New Jersey, United States. It is east of Branch Brook Park and north of the Lower Broadway neighborhood. It is named for the hill overlooking the Passaic River on which it rests.

A number of landmarks in the neighborhood include the former Newark Teachers College, located on the corner of Broadway and 4th Avenue, and is today Technology High School. It also served as the temporary home of Arts High School in the mid-1990s. The open and raised Erie Lackawanna (Norfolk Southern) railroad's NX Bridge, which appeared in the film Annie overlooks over the neighborhood. Erie Lackawanna discontinued passenger service on the Newark Branch in '66, there was a small station at 4th Ave near Passaic St as was a small freight yard and tower. Today the branch is freight only and operated by Norfolk Southern Railroad.

See also
 Broadway, Newark, New Jersey
 Mount Pleasant Cemetery, Newark

Neighborhoods in Newark, New Jersey